Guilty Pleasure is the sixth studio album by American Nu metalcore band Attila. The album released on November 24, 2014, through Artery Recordings. It is the band's fourth and final release on the label.

The album is the third by the band to be produced by Joey Sturgis, who has previously worked with such bands as The Devil Wears Prada, Emmure, We Came as Romans, Asking Alexandria and Miss May I.

Commercial performance
Guilty Pleasure marked the biggest sales week for Attila in their career, selling over 18,500 copies. However, it did not break the record for highest chart position, debuting only at number 54 on the Billboard 200.

Track listing

Personnel

Attila
Chris "Fronz" Fronzak – vocals
Chris Linck – lead guitar
Nate Salameh – rhythm guitar
Sean Heenan – drums
Kalan Blehm – bass

Production
Produced by Joey Sturgis and Kalan Blehm
Engineered by Nick Scott
Mixed, Mastered, vocal engineering and editing by Joey Sturgis @ 37 Recording Studio, Detroit, Michigan
Drum engineering and editing by Joseph Hall
A&R by Mike Milford (The Artery Foundation)
Art direction and layout by Mike Milford & Attila
Photo by Adam Elmakias and Jared Burnett

In popular culture
"Hate Me" is featured in the 2016 film Hell or High Water.

References

2014 albums
Attila (metalcore band) albums
Artery Recordings albums
Albums produced by Joey Sturgis